Dana Carleton Munro (June 8, 1866 – January 13, 1933) was an American historian, brother of Wilfred Harold Munro, born at Bristol, R.I.  He was educated at Brown (A.M., 1890) and in Europe at Strassburg and Freiburg.  He taught at Penn (1893–1902), at Wisconsin until 1915, then at Princeton. He was elected as a member to the American Philosophical Society in 1901. Brown gave him the degree of Doctor of humane letters (L.H.D.) in 1912.  He edited Translations and Reprints from the Original Sources of History (1894–1902).  He was co-author of Mediœval Civilization (1904, 1906) and Essays on the Crusades (1902).

Among the graduate students who studied under Munro were Bernadotte Everly Schmitt, William Ezra Lingelbach, Louis J. Paetow, and Frederick Duncalf.

His son, Dana Gardner Munro, was also a historian.

Books
 A Syllabus of Mediœval History (seventh edition, 1913)
 A History of the Middle Ages (1902)
 A Source Book of Roman History (1904)
 The Kingdom of The Crusaders  (1935)

References

External links

 
 

1866 births
1933 deaths
American book editors
American essayists
American historians
Brown University alumni
Historians of the Crusades
Historians of the Children's Crusade
Presidents of the American Historical Association
People from Bristol, Rhode Island
University of Pennsylvania faculty
University of Wisconsin–Madison faculty
Fellows of the Medieval Academy of America